The province of North Maluku in Indonesia is divided into regencies which in turn are divided administratively into districts, known as Kecamantan.

The districts of North Maluku, with the regency each falls into, are as follows:

Bacan Selatan, Halmahera Selatan
Bacan Timur, Halmahera Selatan
Bacan, Halmahera Selatan
Galela, Halmahera Utara
Gane Barat, Halmahera Selatan
Gane Timur, Halmahera Selatan
Gebe, Halmahera Tengah
Ibu Selatan, Halmahera Barat
Ibu Utara, Halmahera Barat
Ibu, Halmahera Barat
Jailolo Selatan, Halmahera Barat
Jailolo Timur, Halmahera Barat
Jailolo, Halmahera Barat
Kao, Halmahera Utara
Kayoa, Halmahera Selatan
Loloda Utara, Halmahera Utara
Loloda, Halmahera Barat
Maba Selatan, Halmahera Timur
Maba, Halmahera Timur
Malifut, Halmahera Utara
Mangoli Barat, Kepulauan Sula
Mangoli Timur, Kepulauan Sula
Morotai Jaya, Pulau Morotai
Morotai Selatan Barat, Pulau Morotai
Morotai Selatan, Pulau Morotai
Morotai Timur, Pulau Morotai
Morotai Utara, Pulau Morotai
Moti, Ternate
Nggele, Kepulauan Sula
Oba Utara, Tidore Kepulauan
Oba, Tidore Kepulauan
Obi Selatan, Halmahera Selatan
Obi, Halmahera Selatan
Patani Utara, Halmahera Tengah
Patani, Halmahera Tengah
Pulau Makian, Halmahera Selatan
Pulau Ternate, Ternate
Sahu Timur, Halmahera Barat
Sahu, Halmahera Barat
Sanana, Kepulauan Sula
Sula Besi Barat, Kepulauan Sula
Taliabu Barat, Kepulauan Sula
Taliabu Timur, Kepulauan Sula
Ternate Selatan, Ternate
Ternate Utara, Ternate
Tidore Selatan, Tidore Kepulauan
Tidore Utara, Tidore Kepulauan
Tidore, Tidore Kepulauan
Tobelo Selatan, Halmahera Utara
Tobelo, Halmahera Utara
Wasile Selatan, Halmahera Timur
Wasile, Halmahera Timur
Weda Selatan, Halmahera Tengah
Weda Utara, Halmahera Tengah
Weda, Halmahera Tengah

Villages
Administrative villages (desa) listed for each district:

References

 
North Maluku